Yu Hui is the name of:

Yu Hui (actress) (born 1965), Chinese actress
Yu Hui (archer) (born 1980), Chinese Olympic archer

See also
Yuhui District, a district in Bengbu, Anhui, China